Vassmolösa is a locality situated in Kalmar Municipality, Kalmar County, Sweden with 535 inhabitants in 2010. It has a Thing, inn, railway station, sawmill and cement foundry.

References 
Merriam, D. (2011). Some Notable Swedish-American Geologists with a Kansas Connection. Transactions of the Kansas Academy of Science, [online] 114(3 &amp; 4), pp. 277–280. 

Populated places in Kalmar County
Populated places in Kalmar Municipality